Acacia williamsiana is a tree or shrub belonging to the genus Acacia and the subgenus Juliflorae that is native to eastern Australia.

Description
Like most species of Acacia it has phyllodes rather than true leaves. The generally glabrous phyllodes have many longitudinal nerves that are closely parallel with three to five nerves that are more prominent than the others. It flowers between September and December and produces simple inflorescences form cylindrical flower-spikes with pale yellow flowers. The black to dark brown seeds inside are arranged longitudinally and have an ellipsoid shape.

Taxonomy
The specific epithet honours John Beaumont Williams who was a botanist and teacher who had worked at New England University in Armidale and first noticed the distinctiveness of this species.

Distribution
It is endemic to south eastern Queensland and north eastern New South Wales and has a disjunct distribution. In New South Wales it is found in a  radius centred around Glen Innes out to around Ashford in the west and to around Torrington in the north and in areas around Ballandean in southern Queensland. It is often situated around granite outcrops as a part of woodland and low shrubland communities.

See also
List of Acacia species

References

williamsiana
Flora of Queensland
Flora of New South Wales
Plants described in 1997